Shannon Spake  (born July 23, 1976) is an NFL reporter and NASCAR host for Fox Sports. Previously, she worked for ESPN where she contributed to SportsCenter to give pre and post-game reports, and also worked as a sideline reporter for SEC on ESPN basketball games as well as college football games. Spake also worked for the newly created SEC Network which is owned by ESPN.

Before coming to ESPN, Spake  worked at Speed channel, where she co-hosted NASCAR Nation in its second version (June through November 2005) and was a reporter in its first (February through June 2005).  She also co-hosted Back Seat Drivers, a talk show, with online columnist Marty Smith.  Her previous on-air jobs included those at WCCB in Charlotte, North Carolina, and Carolina Sports and Entertainment Television.

From 2007 to 2014. Spake  was a NASCAR pit reporter for the network and contributed to both NASCAR Countdown and NASCAR Now. For the 2008 season, Spake was a full-time pit reporter for Nationwide and Sprint Cup races aired on ESPN. She would continue this role until ESPN lost the broadcast rights to NBC Sports beginning with the 2015 season. On August 13, 2013, Spake agreed to a multi-year contract extension with ESPN.

Before becoming an on-air reporter, she worked for Nickelodeon, CBS (on The Early Show with Bryant Gumbel), and MTV as a production assistant.

Spake  grew up in Florida. She is a graduate of Piper High School and Florida Atlantic University. In 1999 she served as an intern for the Miami-based radio talk show host Neil Rogers.

It was announced on July 6, 2016 that Fox has hired Spake and will serve as a sideline reporter on their college football and basketball broadcasts, as a pit road reporter for NASCAR events and a contributor to NASCAR Race Hub, and as a sideline reporter for select NFL broadcasts.

On February 13, 2017 Spake  was named the new co-host of NASCAR Race Hub, working alongside Adam Alexander.  Spake also hosts NASCAR RaceDay on Saturdays and Sundays 

In 2017 Spake was the voice of Shannon Spokes in the Pixar film Cars 3.

Personal life
Spake married Jerry McSorley on April 14, 2008 at the Augustinian Priory in Ireland.  Spake gave birth to twins, Brady and Liam, on January 1, 2010.

Despite having corrective Scoliosis surgery at age 12, she is active in the endurance sports community having competed in two full marathons and five 70.3 Ironman events as well as many shorter distance triathlons. She is currently training for the World Championship in Kona.

References

External links
Shannon Spake's ESPN Bio
Yahoo Group

College basketball announcers in the United States
College football announcers
Women sports announcers
Motorsport announcers
Florida Atlantic University alumni
1976 births
Living people
Piper High School (Florida) alumni